Onèsphore Nkunzimana (born July 23, 1985 in Burundi) is a male long-distance runner

His first major competition was the 2000 World Junior Championships in Athletics, where he finished ninth in the 5000 metres

He switched from Burundi to represent Qatar and adopted a new name Sultan Khamis Zaman while competing for them. He ran under his new name and country at the 2004 Summer Olympics. He finished eighth in the short race at the 2004 IAAF World Cross Country Championships and won a team silver medal with Qatar.

He ran at the 2005 World Championships and the 2005 IAAF World Half Marathon Championships, finishing in 16th and 19th place, respectively. He won the Eurocross meeting in 2005 and 2007. He won the bronze medal in the 5000 m at the 2006 Asian Games.

He took the 3000 metres gold medal at the 2008 Asian Indoor Athletics Championships. He won his second world cross country team medal shortly after with a 22nd-place finish at the 2008 World Championships. He represented Qatar at a major competition for a final time at the 2008 Beijing Olympics, but he did not progress beyond the heats.

He changed his allegiance again in 2010, returning to Burundi, and changed back to compete under his birth name, Onèsphore Nkunzimana. He won the Eurocross for a third time in February 2010.

References

External links

1985 births
Living people
Burundian male long-distance runners
Qatari male long-distance runners
Olympic athletes of Qatar
Athletes (track and field) at the 2004 Summer Olympics
Athletes (track and field) at the 2008 Summer Olympics
Asian Games medalists in athletics (track and field)
Athletes (track and field) at the 2006 Asian Games
Naturalised citizens of Qatar
Qatari people of Burundian descent
Asian Games bronze medalists for Qatar
Medalists at the 2006 Asian Games